The 2022 Indian Super League Final was the eighth Indian Super League final match, played to determine the champions of the 2021–22 Indian Super League season. It was played on 20 March 2022 between Hyderabad and Kerala Blasters at the Fatorda Stadium in Margao, Goa. The match had spectators attending for the first time after two years. 

The match ended 1–1 after extra time, with Hyderabad winning 3–1 on penalties to secure their first Indian Super League title.

Background 
Hyderabad finished second in the regular season table and won 3–2 aggregate against ATK Mohun Bagan in the playoff semi-final to qualify for the final for the first time in club history.

Kerala Blasters finished fourth in the regular season table and won 2–1 aggregate against league premiers Jamshedpur in the playoff semi-final to qualify for their third appearance in the final.

Match

References

External links
 Indian Super League Official Website.

Indian Super League finals
2021–22 Indian Super League season
2021–22 in Indian football
Indian Super League Final
Kerala Blasters FC matches